This page presents the results of the men's and women's volleyball tournament during the 1955 Pan American Games, which was held from March 15 to March 24, 1955 in Mexico City, Mexico.

Men's indoor tournament

Preliminary round robin

|}

Final ranking

Women's indoor tournament

Preliminary round robin

Final ranking

References
 Todor66: Men's Volleyball Pan American Games 1955
 Todor66: Women's Volleyball Pan American Games 1955
 
 
  .

1955
Events at the 1955 Pan American Games
Pan American Games
1955 Pan American Games